The 1947–48 NHL season was the 31st season of the National Hockey League. Six teams each played 60 games. The Toronto Maple Leafs were the Stanley Cup winners. They defeated the Detroit Red Wings four games to none. This season saw the introduction of a new trophy – Art Ross Trophy – that would be handed out to the player who scored the most points during the regular season.

Regular season
The season saw the return of the National Hockey League All-Star Game, an idea that, although proposed in the previous season, came into fruition this year. The all-star game, however, saw a bad ankle injury to Chicago Black Hawks forward Bill Mosienko that nearly ended his career. Other stars would retire, ending both the Montreal Canadiens' Punch line and the Boston Bruins' Kraut line. However, this season saw the creation of the Detroit Red Wings' Production Line. The policy of having players raise their hockey sticks to signify that a goal was scored was also initiated in this season, at the suggestion of Frank Patrick, with Habs forward Billy Reay being the first to do on November 13, 1947. The season also saw Boston's Don Gallinger suspended indefinitely pending an investigation of gambling activities and the New York Rangers' Billy "The Kid" Taylor being expelled for life for gambling.

Seven games into the season, the Toronto Maple Leafs and Chicago Black Hawks made, at that time, the biggest trade in NHL history. The Maple Leafs sent five players to the Black Hawks in trade for Max Bentley and rookie winger Cy Thomas. Thomas only played eight games that year but Bentley handed to the Leafs a much-needed offensive boost that helped propel the team to first overall and an eventual Stanley Cup.

The New York Rangers decided to make a trade to improve their fortunes and sent Hal Laycoe, Joe Bell, and George Robertson to Montreal in exchange for Buddy O'Connor and defenceman Frank Eddolls. Montreal missed O'Connor, as their goal-scoring plummeted. Ken Mosdell was out from the start of the season with a broken arm, Rocket Richard had trouble with a bad knee and Murph Chamberlain broke his leg. In an attempt to boost the goal-scoring, Montreal traded Jimmy Peters and Johnny Quilty to Boston in exchange for Joe Carveth, but the rot continued. However, the worst occurred on January 11, 1948, when the Canadiens played the Rangers at Madison Square Garden. The Habs lost more than a game when Bill Juzda checked captain Toe Blake into the boards, breaking Blake's ankle and ending his career. It was also the end of the famed "Punch Line". (Ironically, that same night, Johnny Quilty's career was ended with a compound fracture of the leg). The Canadiens missed the playoffs for the first time since 1940, and Bill Durnan, for the only time in his career, failed to win the Vezina Trophy. This season was also the last season in which a goaltender was allowed to be named captain of their team. Bill Durnan was the last goaltender in NHL history to be captain. Toronto's Turk Broda won the Vezina this season.

Final standings

Playoffs

Playoff bracket

Semifinals

(1) Toronto Maple Leafs vs. (3) Boston Bruins
Toronto defeated Boston four games to one, although Boston kept it closer than the series tally would indicate. Three of the five games were decided by a single goal.

(2) Detroit Red Wings vs. (4) New York Rangers

It looked initially to be a close series as, after the Blueshirts lost the first two games, the Rangers won the next two to tie the series. Detroit then took the next two to win the series in six games to qualify for the Finals.

Stanley Cup Finals

Awards

All-Star teams

Player statistics

Scoring leaders
GP = Games Played, G = Goals, A = Assists, Pts = Points

Source: NHL

Leading goaltendersGP = Games Played, TOI = Time on ice (minutes), GA = Goals Against, SO = Shutouts, GAA = Goals against average''

Coaches
Boston Bruins: Dit Clapper
Chicago Black Hawks: Johnny Gottselig
Detroit Red Wings: Tommy Ivan
Montreal Canadiens: Dick Irvin
New York Rangers: Frank Boucher
Toronto Maple Leafs: Hap Day

Debuts
The following is a list of players of note who played their first NHL game in 1947–48 (listed with their first team):
Ed Sandford, Boston Bruins
Paul Ronty, Boston Bruins
Metro Prystai, Chicago Black Hawks
Marty Pavelich, Detroit Red Wings
Red Kelly, Detroit Red Wings
Floyd Curry, Montreal Canadiens
Tom Johnson, Montreal Canadiens
Gerry McNeil, Montreal Canadiens
Doug Harvey, Montreal Canadiens
Ed Kullman, New York Rangers
Fleming MacKell, Toronto Maple Leafs
Tod Sloan, Toronto Maple Leafs

Last games
The following is a list of players of note that played their last game in the NHL in 1947–48 (listed with their last team):
John Quilty, Boston Bruins
John Mariucci, Chicago Black Hawks
Toe Blake, Montreal Canadiens
Bryan Hextall, New York Rangers
Phil Watson, New York Rangers
Billy Taylor, New York Rangers
Syl Apps, Toronto Maple Leafs
Nick Metz, Toronto Maple Leafs

See also
1947-48 NHL transactions
List of Stanley Cup champions
1st National Hockey League All-Star Game
National Hockey League All-Star Game
Ice hockey at the 1948 Winter Olympics
1947 in sports
1948 in sports

References 
 
 
 
 
 
 

Notes

External links
 Hockey Database

 
1947–48 in American ice hockey by league
1947–48 in Canadian ice hockey by league